John Edwards (c. 1562 – 1625), of Plas Newydd, Chirk, Denbighshire, was a Welsh politician.

He was a Member (MP) of the Parliament of England for Denbighshire in 1589.

References

1560s births
1625 deaths
16th-century Welsh politicians
Members of the Parliament of England for Denbighshire
Members of the Parliament of England (pre-1707) for constituencies in Wales
English MPs 1589